Hypolimnas anthedon, the variable eggfly or variable diadem, is a species of Hypolimnas butterfly found in southern Africa. There are four known subspecies, but it is very variable species with many morphs.

The wingspan of the variable eggfly is 75–80  for males and 74–90  for females.

Its flight period is year round, peaking in late summer.

The larva of Hypolimnas anthedon eat: Fleurya species, Urera camerooensis, Urera camerooensis, Urtica, and Berkheya.

Subspecies
H. a. anthedon (southern Senegal, Gambia, Guinea-Bissau, Guinea, Sierra Leone, Liberia, Ivory Coast, Ghana, Togo, Nigeria, Cameroon, Equatorial Guinea, Gabon, Congo, Central African Republic, Angola, Democratic Republic of the Congo, southern Sudan, western Kenya, north-western Tanzania, northern and north-western Zambia)
H. a. drucei (Butler, 1874) (Madagascar, Comoros, Mauritius)
H. a. wahlbergi (Wallengren, 1857) (Ethiopia, eastern Democratic Republic of the Congo, Kenya (east of the Rift Valley), eastern Tanzania, Zambia, Mozambique, Zimbabwe, South Africa, Eswatini )

References

anthedon
Butterflies described in 1845